Clairvillia is a genus of flies in the family Tachinidae.

Species
C. amicta Reinhard, 1962
C. biguttata (Meigen, 1824)
C. breviforceps Emden, 1954
C. curialis Reinhard, 1958
C. furcata (Wulp, 1890)
C. nitoris (Coquillett, 1898)
C. pninae Kugler, 1971
C. timberlakei (Walton, 1914)

References

Phasiinae
Tachinidae genera
Taxa named by Jean-Baptiste Robineau-Desvoidy